Geraldine "Geri" Chance Torres Gutierrez is a Guamanian businesswoman, politician and former First Lady of Guam from 1995 until 2003.

Early life 
Gutierrez was born in Guam. Gutierrez's full name was Geraldine Chance Torres. Gutierrez grandfather was Jose Martinez Torres.

Career 
As a businesswoman, in 1971, Gutierrez started Carltom Enterprises, a construction business with her husband and her brother-in-law.

Gutierrez is an administrator of the estate of Jose Martinez Torres, her grandfather.

In November 1994, when Carl Gutierrez won the election as the Governor of Guam, Gutierrez became the First Lady of Guam. Gutierrez served as First Lady of Guam on January 2, 1995, until January 6, 2003.

Gutierrez is a member of Guam's family violence task force. In October 1997, while Guam celebrated Family Violence Awareness Month, at the national level, Gutierrez represented Guam in Washington, D.C.

In 2000, A group of supporters of Governor Carl T.C. Gutierrez, including Republicans, want Gutierrez to be the next Governor of Guam. Women of the Democratic Party, which believes that the time has come for a woman to be Guam’s next Governor.

Personal life 
Gutierrez' husband is Carl Gutierrez. They have three children, Carla, Tommy, and Hannah.

Gutierrez' god children are Dr. Jim Flores and Joleen Respicio.

See also 
 Korean Air Flight 801 crash on August 6, 1997.
 Typhoon Paka in December 1997.

References

External links 
 William J. Clinton - Remarks to Micronesian Island Leaders in Agana Heights, Guam November 23, 1998
 Image of Geri T. Gutierrez in FOCUS July 28,2014 at mbjguam.com

First Ladies and Gentlemen of Guam
Guamanian Democrats
Guamanian women in politics
Year of birth missing (living people)
Living people
21st-century American women